Björn Nord (born April 5, 1972) is a Swedish former professional ice hockey defenceman. Nord began playing hockey in Huddinge IK where he also played until the 1992–93 Elitserien season when he joined Djurgårdens IF. He stayed in Djurgården until his retirement in 2004 with the exception of the 2000–01 season when he played with German side Nürnberg Ice Tigers. Nord was forced to retire after suffering a serious injury in December 2003. He won a Swedish Championship with Djurgården in 1999–2000 Elitserien season. Nord was drafted in 9th round, 289th overall, by the Washington Capitals in the 2000 NHL Entry Draft.

Career statistics

Regular season and playoffs

International

References

External links

1972 births
Living people
Djurgårdens IF Hockey players
Huddinge IK players
Nürnberg Ice Tigers players
Washington Capitals draft picks
Swedish ice hockey defencemen
Swedish expatriate ice hockey players in Germany